Abucay, officially the Municipality of Abucay, ,  is a 3rd class municipality in the province of , Philippines. According to the 2020 census, it has a population of 42,984 people.

Its westernmost elevated section is located within the Bataan National Park.

History

The first printing press in the Archipelago was found in this town. Tomas Pinpin, the first Filipino printer, learned the art from Fray Francisco Blanca de San Jose and Juan de Vera, a Chinese printer at the University of Santo Tomas.

On June 23, 1647, a fierce battle was fought between the Dutch invaders and the Pampango defenders in the near the Abucay church area. Nearly 200 Pampangos were put to death and 40 others together with Pampanga’s Spanish alcalde mayor (town mayor) Antonio de Cabrera. Dominican priests Father Geronimo Sotomayor and Father Tomas Ramos were taken to Batavia.

Geography
Abucay borders Balanga (the capital city) to the south, Samal to the north and northwest, Morong to the west, and Manila Bay to the east.

According to the Philippine Statistics Authority, the municipality has a land area of  constituting  of the  total area of Bataan.

Topography of Abucay varies from the mountainous terrain of Mount Natib caldera in the west to the coastal areas of the province along the shore of Manila Bay. Six rivers with a combined length of  originate from the mountain flowing in the west-to-east direction.

Climate

Barangays
Abucay is politically subdivided into 9 barangays.

Demographics

In the 2020 census, Abucay had a population of 42,984.

Most of the people of Abucay speak the Tagalog language. There are also residents who speak "Kapampangang Hilaw," a dialect variation of the Kapampangan language, in Barangay Mabatang.

Economy 

Abucay is basically an agricultural and fishing town. These fishponds are rich with commercial species like milkfish, tilapia, pla-pla and shrimps.

Agricultural lands in Abucay produces rice, corn, root crops, legumes, vegetable and various kinds of fruits as well as forest-grown bamboo and buho. Most of the walis tambo (local brooms) sold in Baguio come from Abucay.

Government

The political seat of the municipal government is located at the Municipal Hall (also called Town Hall). During the Spanish colonial period, the Gobernadorcillo was the chief executive who held office at the town hall, then called the Presidencia.

During the American period from 1898 to 1946, the elected Mayor and local officials, including the appointed ones hold office at the Municipal Town Hall. The executive and legislative departments perform their functions at the Sangguniang Bayan (Session Hall) and Municipal Trial Court, respectively, which are located at the Municipal Hall.

Abucay's incumbent elected officials are Mayor Liberato P. Santiago (NPC), a land developer and a nth-time re-electionist, and Vice Mayor Ma. Khristine G. Dela Fuente (Lakas-Kampi-CMD). Santiago owns various villages and subdivisions - all converted from ricefields or fishponds. The eight (8) Sangguniang Bayan members led by the Vice Mayor hold office at the Abucay Sangguniang Bayan Session Hall.

Tourism

Saint Dominic de Guzman Parish Church

One of the oldest in the Philippines, the first Abucay Church was established in 1587 and was administered by the Dominicans in 1588. The present church was built sometime in the early 1600s, the exact year is still unknown. The Church was badly damaged by the earthquake of September 16, 1852, and again by a fire in 1870. Father Jose Diego Pelaez rebuilt the church.

The church still houses the bells donated in 1839 and 1859.  The five bells of the Abucay Church were restored on January 17, 1978, by U.S. Naval Base Facility in Subic Bay, Zambales province according to a historical marker in the church.

The Parish of Saint Dominic de Guzman has a population of 19,501 Catholics. Its patron saint is Saint Dominic de Guzman and the town's feast day is August 8. The present parish priest is Rev. Fr. Josue V. Enero succeeding Rev. Msgr. Remigio R. Hizon, Jr. in June 2017. The church belongs to the Roman Catholic Diocese of Balanga under the Vicariate of Saint Dominic de Guzman.

Other attractions
Landmarks include the following:
 Tomas Pinpin Monument — a memorial to Tomas Pinpin, the "Patriarch of Filipino Printing" in barangay Ibayo. The monument stands at the center of Tomas Pinpin Memorial Elementary School, the central and the biggest public elementary school in Abucay.
 Maria Canon Statue — In Barangay Sibul, a tower was erected by the Mie-ken Daiichi Shiēseo of the Japanese Sohyōshin Sports in 1978 to invoke the repose of dead souls from the World War II period.
 Pasukulan Falls — located in west Abucay in the forested valley of Mount Natib. The place is ideal for picnics.
 Sibul Springs — located in western Abucay featuring sulfuric swimming pools with a wide area for outdoor recreation. Its main attraction is the natural spring believed to provide muscle pain relief.
 Christmas Village in Mabatang — Christmas celebration in Mabatang extends to the streets of every sitio in the barangay, which are lavishly adorned to rejoice the season.
 Abucay Cockpit

Infrastructure
Electric power for Abucay is served by the Peninsula Electric Cooperative (PENELCO).

A  sanitary landfill in Sitio Macao in Barangay Capitangan is the first of its kind in the province of Bataan.

Education

Universities and colleges
 Bataan Peninsula State University-Abucay campus - formerly the Bataan National Agricultural School (BNAS) now part of the state university in Bataan.

Gallery

References

External links

 [ Philippine Standard Geographic Code]

Municipalities of Bataan
Populated places on Manila Bay
1587 establishments in the Philippines
Populated places established in 1587